Doug Day, Jr. is an American former basketball player and current high school coach.

Playing career
At , Day played the shooting guard position for Radford University between 1989–90 and 1992–93. He was a prolific three-point field goal shooter; at the time of his graduation, his 401 made three-pointers were the most in NCAA Division I history. Day led the nation in threes made per game as a junior when he connected for 4.03 per contest. That season, he led the Highlanders to their first Big South Conference men's basketball regular season championship; it was also the second of back-to-back 20-win seasons.

In each of Day's four seasons he was named to an All-Big South team. He graduated in 1993 as the school's all-time leading scorer with 2,027 points, which through 2017–18 is still the record. Day also set the Radford record for points in a game with 43, which he achieved on December 12, 1990 against Central Connecticut State. He holds many of the three-point records at Radford as well, including makes in a game (11, twice), season (117) and career (401); and attempts in a game (19), season (314), and career (1,068).

Day was inducted into the Radford University Hall of Fame in 1998 and the Big South Conference Hall of Fame in 2005.

Coaching career
After graduating from Radford in 1993 with a degree in education, Day began his coaching career as an assistant boys' basketball coach at Northside High School in Roanoke, Virginia. He spent several seasons at Northside until becoming an assistant at his alma mater, Blacksburg High School, in Blacksburg, Virginia. After five seasons, head coach Bob Trear stepped down and in August 2010 Day became the new boys' head coach, a position he still holds today.

See also
 List of NCAA Division I men's basketball season 3-point field goal leaders
 List of NCAA Division I men's basketball career 3-point scoring leaders

References

1970s births
Living people
American men's basketball coaches
American men's basketball players
Basketball coaches from Virginia
Basketball players from Virginia
High school basketball coaches in Virginia
People from Blacksburg, Virginia
Radford Highlanders men's basketball players
Shooting guards